Stygobromus is a genus of amphipod crustaceans that live in subterranean habitats. The majority of the listed species are endemic to North America (one from Canada, the rest from the United States), a smaller number of species are also known from Eurasia. Most of the North American species live in areas which were not covered by the Laurentide Ice Sheet, although a few species seem to have survived under the ice. A number of species are on the IUCN Red List as endangered species (EN) or vulnerable species (VU); one species, S. lucifugus, is extinct.

Stygobromus includes the following species:

Stygobromus abditus Holsinger, 1978 (Virginia)
Stygobromus ackerlyi Holsinger, 1978 (Georgia)
Stygobromus alabamensis (Stout, 1911)
Stygobromus albapinus Taylor & Holsinger, 2011 (Nevada)
Stygobromus allegheniensis (Holsinger, 1967) (New York to West Virginia)
Stygobromus ambulans (F. Müller, 1846)
Stygobromus anastasiae Sidorov, Holsinger & Takhteev, 2010 (Siberia, Russia)
Stygobromus apscheronia (Derzhavin, 1945) (Azerbaijan)
Stygobromus araeus (Holsinger, 1969)  (Virginia, North Carolina)
Stygobromus arizonensis Holsinger, 1974  (Arizona)
Stygobromus balconis (Hubricht, 1943)  (Texas)
Stygobromus baroodyi Holsinger, 1978 (Virginia)
Stygobromus barri (Holsinger, 1967)  (Missouri)
Stygobromus barryi Holsinger, 1978 (Tennessee)
Stygobromus behningi (Birstein, 1948)
Stygobromus bifurcatus (Holsinger, 1967)  (Texas)
Stygobromus biggersi Holsinger, 1978 (Virginia to Pennsylvania)
Stygobromus blinni Wang & Holsinger, 2001
Stygobromus borealis Holsinger, 1978 (Vermont, New York)
Stygobromus boultoni Wang & Holsinger, 2001
Stygobromus bowmani (Holsinger, 1967)  (Oklahoma)
Stygobromus canadensis Holsinger, 1980 (Alberta, Canada)
Stygobromus carolinensis Holsinger, 1978 (North Carolina)
Stygobromus chamberlaini Ellis, 1941
Stygobromus cherylae Wang & Holsinger, 2001
Stygobromus clantoni (Creaser, 1934)  (Kansas, Missouri)
Stygobromus coeca (Dobraenu & Manolache, 1951)
Stygobromus coloradensis Ward, 1977
Stygobromus conradi (Holsinger, 1967)  (Virginia)
Stygobromus cooperi (Holsinger, 1967)  (West Virginia)
Stygobromus cowani Wang & Holsinger, 2001
Stygobromus culveri Holsinger, 1978 (West Virginia)
Stygobromus cumberlandus Holsinger, 1978 (Virginia)
Stygobromus curroae Wang & Holsinger, 2001
Stygobromus dejectus (Holsinger, 1967)  (Texas)
Stygobromus dentata (Hubricht, 1943)
Stygobromus dershavini (Behning, 1928)
Stygobromus dicksoni Holsinger, 1978 (Alabama, Georgia)
Stygobromus donensis (Martynov, 1919)
Stygobromus duplus Wang & Holsinger, 2001
Stygobromus elatus (Holsinger, 1967)  (Arkansas)
Stygobromus elliotti Holsinger, 1974
Stygobromus emarginatus (Hubricht, 1943)  (Maryland, West Virginia)
Stygobromus ephemerus (Holsinger, 1969)  (Virginia)
Stygobromus estesi Holsinger, 1978 (Virginia)
Stygobromus exilis Hubricht, 1943
Stygobromus fecundus Holsinger, 1978 (Tennessee)
Stygobromus fergusoni Holsinger, 1978 (Virginia)
Stygobromus finleyi Holsinger, 1978 (Tennessee)
Stygobromus flagellatus (J. E. Benedict, 1896)  (Texas)
Stygobromus fontinalis Wang & Holsinger, 2001
Stygobromus franzi Holsinger, 1978 (Maryland)
Stygobromus gallawayae Wang & Holsinger, 2001
Stygobromus glacialis Wang & Holsinger, 2001
Stygobromus gracilipes (Holsinger, 1967) (Virginia to Pennsylvania)
Stygobromus gradyi Holsinger, 1974  (California)
Stygobromus grahami Holsinger, 1974
Stygobromus grandis Holsinger, 1978 (Georgia)
Stygobromus hadenoecus (Holsinger, 1966)  (Texas)
Stygobromus harai Holsinger, 1974  (California)
Stygobromus hayi (Hubricht & Mackin, 1940)  (District of Columbia)
Stygobromus herbsti Wang & Holsinger, 2001
Stygobromus heteropodus Hubricht, 1943  (Missouri)
Stygobromus hoffmani Holsinger, 1978 (Virginia)
Stygobromus holsingeri Ward, 1977
Stygobromus hubbardi Holsinger, 2009 
Stygobromus hubbsi Shoemaker, 1942  (Oregon)
Stygobromus hyporheicus Wang & Holsinger, 2001
Stygobromus hyrcana (Dershavin, 1939)
Stygobromus idahoensis Wang & Holsinger, 2001
Stygobromus imperialis Wang & Holsinger, 2001
Stygobromus indentatus (Holsinger, 1967)  (Maryland, North Carolina and Virginia)
Stygobromus inexpectatus Holsinger, 1978 (Alabama)
Stygobromus interitus Holsinger, 1978 (Virginia)
Stygobromus intermedia (Dobreanu, Manolache & Piascariu, 1952)
Stygobromus interstitialis Wang & Holsinger, 2001
Stygobromus iowae Hubricht, 1943
Stygobromus jakutana (Martynov, 1931)
Stygobromus jemezensis Wang & Holsinger, 2001
Stygobromus johanseni (Shoemaker, 1920)
Stygobromus kazakhstanica Kulkina, 1992
Stygobromus kenki Holsinger, 1978 (District of Columbia, Virginia)
Stygobromus lacicolus Holsinger, 1974
Stygobromus lanensis Wang & Holsinger, 2001
Stygobromus latus Wang & Holsinger, 2001
Stygobromus leensis Holsinger, 1978 (Virginia)
Stygobromus lepida (Mateus & Mateus, 1991)
Stygobromus levanidovae (G. Karaman, 1991)
Stygobromus limbus Wang & Holsinger, 2001
Stygobromus longidactylus (S. Karaman, 1929)
Stygobromus longipes (Holsinger, 1966)  (Texas)
Stygobromus lucifugus (Hay, 1882)  (Illinois)
Stygobromus mackenziei Holsinger, 1974  (California)
Stygobromus mackini Hubricht, 1943 (Tennessee to West Virginia)
Stygobromus meschtscherica (Borutsky, 1929)
Stygobromus mikhaili Sidorov, Holsinger & Takhteev, 2010 (Siberia, Russia)
Stygobromus minutus Holsinger, 1978 (Georgia)
Stygobromus montanensis Holsinger, 1974 (Montana)
Stygobromus montanus (Holsinger, 1967)  (Arkansas)
Stygobromus morrisoni (Holsinger, 1967)  (Virginia, West Virginia)
Stygobromus mundus (Holsinger, 1967)  (Virginia)
Stygobromus myersae Wang & Holsinger, 2001
Stygobromus mysticus Holsinger, 1974
Stygobromus nanus Holsinger, 1978 (West Virginia)
Stygobromus nortoni (Holsinger, 1969)  (Tennessee)
Stygobromus obrutus Holsinger, 1978 (Virginia)
Stygobromus obscurus Holsinger, 1974
Stygobromus onondagaensis (Hubricht & Mackin, 1940)  (Arkansas, Kansas, Missouri and Oklahoma)
Stygobromus oregonensis Holsinger, 1974 (Oregon)
Stygobromus ozarkensis (Holsinger, 1967)  (Arkansas, Missouri and Oklahoma)
Stygobromus parvus (Holsinger, 1969)  (West Virginia)
Stygobromus pecki (Holsinger, 1967)  (Texas)
Stygobromus pennaki Ward, 1977
Stygobromus philareti (Birstein, 1948)
Stygobromus phreaticus Holsinger, 1978 (Virginia)
Stygobromus pizzinii (Shoemaker, 1938)  (Virginia to Pennsylvania)
Stygobromus pollostus Holsinger, 1978 (Virginia)
Stygobromus pseudospinosus Holsinger, 1978 (Virginia)
Stygobromus putealis (Holmes, 1909) 
Stygobromus puteanus Holsinger, 1974
Stygobromus quatsinensis Holsinger & Shaw, 1987
Stygobromus rallus Wang & Holsinger, 2001
Stygobromus redactus Holsinger, 1978 (West Virginia)
Stygobromus reddelli (Holsinger, 1966) 
Stygobromus rudolphi Wang & Holsinger, 2001
Stygobromus russelli (Holsinger, 1967) (Texas)
Stygobromus saltuaris Wang & Holsinger, 2001
Stygobromus secundus Bousfield & Holsinger, 1981
Stygobromus sheldoni Holsinger, 1974
Stygobromus sierrensis Holsinger, 1974
Stygobromus simplex Wang & Holsinger, 2001
Stygobromus smithi Hubricht, 1943  (Alabama)
Stygobromus sparsus Holsinger, 1978 (Tennessee)
Stygobromus spinatus (Holsinger, 1967)  (West Virginia)
Stygobromus spinosus (Hubricht & Mackin, 1940) (Virginia)
Stygobromus stegerorum Holsinger, 1978 (Virginia)
Stygobromus stellmacki (Holsinger, 1967)  (Pennsylvania)
Stygobromus subtilis (Hubricht, 1943) 
Stygobromus tahoensis Holsinger, 1974
Stygobromus tenuis (S. I. Smith, 1874) (Connecticut to Maryland)
Stygobromus trinus Wang & Holsinger, 2001
Stygobromus tritus Holsinger, 1974
Stygobromus urospinatus Wang & Holsinger, 2001
Stygobromus utahensis Wang & Holsinger, 2001 (Utah)
Stygobromus vitreus Cope, 1872
Stygobromus wahkeenensis  Wang & Holsinger, 2001
Stygobromus wardi Wang & Holsinger, 2001
Stygobromus wengerorum Holsinger, 1974

References

 
Gammaridea
Freshwater crustaceans of North America
Crustacean genera
Taxonomy articles created by Polbot
Taxa named by Edward Drinker Cope
Cave crustaceans